Wolf Tracks is a 1923 American silent Western film directed by Robert N. Bradbury and starring Jack Hoxie, Andrée Tourneur and Marin Sais.

Cast
 Jack Hoxie as John Hastings
 Andrée Tourneur as Jean Meredith
 Marin Sais as Rose Romaine
 Jim Welch as Bob Meredith
 Albert J. Smith as 'Wolf' Santell
 Thomas G. Lingham as Lemuel Blatherwick 
 William Berke as Laroque 
 Kate Price as Kitty Blatherwick

References

Bibliography
 Langman, Larry. A Guide to Silent Westerns. Greenwood Publishing Group, 1992.

External links
 

1923 films
1923 Western (genre) films
1920s English-language films
American black-and-white films
Films directed by Robert N. Bradbury
Silent American Western (genre) films
1920s American films